Hawk Hills is an unincorporated community in Alberta, Canada within Red Deer County that is recognized as a designated place by Statistics Canada. Prior to the 2021 census, Statistics Canada referred to Hawk Hills as Balmoral NW.

Demographics 

See also 
List of communities in Alberta
List of designated places in Alberta

References 

Designated places in Alberta
Localities in Red Deer County